Adolf Knop (12 January 1828, in Altenau – 27 December 1893, in Karlsruhe) was a German geologist and mineralogist.

He studied mathematics and sciences at the University of Göttingen, where he was a pupil of chemist Friedrich Wohler and mineralogist Johann Friedrich Ludwig Hausmann. From 1849 he taught classes at the vocational school in Chemnitz. In 1857 he became an associate professor of geology and mineralogy at the University of Giessen, where in 1863 he attained a full professorship. In 1866 he relocated to Karlsruhe as a professor at the Polytechnic school. In 1878 he succeeded Moritz August Seubert as manager of the Grand Ducal Natural History Cabinet.

He was a catalyst towards the establishment of the Oberrheinischer Geologischer Verein (Upper Rhine Geological Society). A cerium-rich variety of perovskite called "knopite" is named after him.

Selected works 
 Molekularconstitution und wachsthum der krystalle, 1867 – Molecular constitution and growth of crystals.
 Studien über Stoffwandlungen im Mineralreiche besonders in Kalk- und Amphiboloid-Gesteinen, 1873 – Studies on material changes in the mineral kingdom, especially in limestone and amphiboloid rocks.
 System der Anorganographie: als Grundlage für Vorträge an Hochschulen, 1876 – System of "in organography" as a basis for lectures at universities.

References 

1828 births
1893 deaths
People from Goslar (district)
University of Göttingen alumni
Academic staff of the University of Giessen
Academic staff of the Karlsruhe Institute of Technology
19th-century German geologists
German mineralogists